Mikael Mats Johansson (born July 17, 1981) is a professional Swedish professional ice hockey centre, currently playing for Frölunda HC in the Elitserien.

Playing career
Frölunda signed him to a one-year contract prior to the 2007-08 season after spending the previous season with the Malmö Redhawks. He has since signed another two one-year contracts with the club and will remain for the 2009-10 season.

Career statistics

Regular season and playoffs

External links

1981 births
Frölunda HC players
Swedish ice hockey centres
Living people
Ice hockey people from Gothenburg